The Remix: Hip Hop X Fashion, is a 2019 American documentary film directed by Farah X and Lisa Cortes. The film premiered at the 2019 Tribeca Film Festival. It also screened at the University of Wisconsin–Milwaukee, New Orleans Film Festival and Woodstock Film Festival. It was released by Netflix on 22 July 2020.

Premise
The film spotlights fashion architect, stylist and MCM Global Creative Partner, Misa Hylton, one of the first notable stylists to mix streetwear with fashion. The film showcases Hylton’s most recognized fashion looks with her muses including Lil’ Kim, Mary J. Blige and Missy Elliott.

April Walker, iconic streetwear designer, entrepreneur and founder of the Brooklyn born label, Walker Wear, is also chronicled for her contributions in changing the game. Walker, the first woman to dominate urban menswear—secured early endorsements by Hip Hop’s elite—Tupac, The Notorious B.I.G. and others.

The documentary showcases the global cultural impact of Hip Hop and it’s influences on shaping the fashion industry of today. It celebrates the female designers and stylists who were working behind the scenes—and how their iconic styles and trends changed fashion in music—forever.

Accolades

References

External links
 
 

2019 films
2019 documentary films
American documentary films
2010s English-language films
2010s American films